Gombosszeg is a village in Zala County, Hungary.

References

External links 
 Street map 
 Gombosszeg on wiki.utikonyvem.hu 

Populated places in Zala County